Scona may refer to:
Old Scona Academic High School, known as Old Scona, in Edmonton, Canada
Skåne County, the southernmost county of Sweden
Strathcona High School, known as Scona High School. in Edmonton, Canada
MSC Student Conference on National Affairs